Krasnozorensky District is an administrative and municipal district (raion), one of the twenty-four in Oryol Oblast, Russia. It is located in the east of the oblast. Its administrative center is the rural locality (a selo) of Krasnaya Zarya. Population: 6,504 (2010 Census);  The population of Krasnaya Zarya accounts for 24.1% of the district's total population.

Notable residents 

 Viktor Kulikov (1921–2013), Warsaw Pact commander-in-chief 1977–1989, born in the village of Verkhnyaya Lyubovsha

References

Notes

Sources

Districts of Oryol Oblast